Harvey Roy (October 1, 1867 – October 24, 1905) was an American Negro league outfielder in the 1880s.

A native of Washington, DC, Roy played for the Pittsburgh Keystones in 1887. He died in Wheeling, West Virginia in 1905 at age 38.

References

External links
Baseball statistics and player information from Baseball-Reference Black Baseball Stats and Seamheads

1867 births
1905 deaths
Pittsburgh Keystones players
Baseball outfielders
Baseball players from Washington, D.C.
20th-century African-American people